The Louisiana Tech Lady Techsters softball team represents Louisiana Tech University in NCAA Division I college softball. The team participates in Conference USA. They are currently coached by head coach Josh Taylor. They play home games at Dr. Billy Bundrick Field. The Lady Techsters have made eleven NCAA Tournament appearances and have advanced to the Women's College World Series three times.  

On April 25, 2019, a tornado struck the Louisiana Tech campus, completely destroying the team's home stadium that was then known as the Lady Techster Softball Complex. In March of 2020, construction began on a new stadium which was completed and unveiled as the Lady Techsters' new home ahead of the 2021 spring season.

History
In Bill Galloway’s first season as head coach of the Lady Techsters in 1981, he led Tech to a record of 52-18 and the first of three trips to the College World Series, and the tradition of winning and dominance throughout the 1980s began. Louisiana Tech reached the NCAA tournament the next six seasons, including two additional College World Series appearances in 1985 and 1986.

Overall, the Lady Techsters boast three Louisiana Tech College World Series teams (1983, 1985, 1986), 11 NCAA Regional squads (1982, 1983, 1984, 1985, 1986, 1987, 1988, 1995, 2008, 2017, 2019) and five NFCA All-Americans.

Facilities

Lady Techster Softball Complex (1982-2019)
The Lady Techster Softball Complex was home to Louisiana Tech Softball from 1982 until April 25, 2019 when an EF3 tornado destroyed the facility along with a number of other athletic complexes. During the course of the Lady Techsters’ 38-year history of playing at the facility, Tech posted an overall mark of 466-234, including 26 winning seasons. Initially built at a cost of $200,000 in the early 1980s under the supervision of former head coach Bill Galloway and former Tech President F. Jay Taylor, the 550-seat facility boasts brick-walled dugouts, wooden lockers, lights, batting cage and electronic scoreboard. At the time of its completion in the early ’80s, it was considered one of the finest softball facilities in the country as the nationally-ranked Louisiana Tech squads drew large crowds.

Dr. Billy Bundrick Field (2021-Present)
On March 5, 2021, Dr. Billy Bundrick field was christened as the new facility for LA Tech. The field was named in honor of an orthopedic surgeon who has given 40 years of service to the University.

Attendance Record
Louisiana Tech saw a program record 1,927 fans attend the Lady Techsters home game versus LSU on March 15, 2016.

Players

All-Americans

Academic All-Americans
Faith Holman (1986)
Stacey Johnson (1986)
Paige England (1997, 1998, 1999)
Erica St. Romain (1999)

All-Region

First Team
Amberly Waits, shortstop (2009) (Inducted into LA Tech Athletic Hall of Fame, Oct 2019)

National & Conference Awards

C-USA Player of the Year
Morgan Turkoly (OF) - 2018
Jazlyn Crowder (OF) - 2019
C-USA Freshman of the Year
Lindsay Edwards (3B) - 2019
C-USA Pitcher of the Year
Preslee Gallaway (P) - 2018
Senior Class Award
Morgan Turkoly - 2019

WAC Player of the Year
Amberly Waits (SS) - 2009
WAC Freshman of the Year
Anna Cross (SS/P) - 2013

National Pro Fastpitch Draft

Coaches

Hall of Fame

Bill Galloway, head coach (2001)

Regional Coach of the Year
Bill Galloway, head coach (1988)

Results

Women's College World Series Results

Year-by-Year Results

See also
List of NCAA Division I softball programs

References

External links